James Kerr (October 2, 1851 – October 31, 1908) was a member of the United States House of Representatives and later the Clerk of the United States House of Representatives.

Biography
Kerr was born in Reedsville, Mifflin County, Pennsylvania, October 2, 1851; resided in Blair County until 1864; moved to Clearfield in 1867; pursued an academic course. He was a member of the Pennsylvania State Senate from 1869 to 1871. He was also a justice of the peace in 1878; prothonotary for Clearfield County in 1880 and 1883; engaged in the coal and lumber business; elected as a Democrat to the Fifty-first Congress (March 4, 1889 – March 3, 1891); unsuccessful candidate for renomination in 1890; during the Fifty-second and Fifty-third Congresses was appointed Clerk of the United States House of Representatives and served from March 4, 1891 to March 3, 1895; resumed business interests; died in New York City October 31, 1908; interment in Hillcrest Cemetery, Clearfield, Pennsylvania.

References

1851 births
1908 deaths
Democratic Party Pennsylvania state senators
Clerks of the United States House of Representatives
People from Mifflin County, Pennsylvania
People from Blair County, Pennsylvania
Pennsylvania prothonotaries
Democratic Party members of the United States House of Representatives from Pennsylvania
19th-century American politicians